Attorney General Morgan may refer to:

Don Morgan (born c. 1950), Attorney General of Saskatchewan
Richard Morgan (Ceylonese judge) (1821–1876), Queen's Advocate of Ceylon
Robert Burren Morgan (1925–2016), Attorney General of North Carolina
William J. Morgan (Wisconsin politician) (1883–1983), Attorney General of Wisconsin

See also
General Morgan (disambiguation)